Hermann Voss (born 9 July 1934) is a German violist, painter and puppet player. From 1975 to 2005 he taught viola and chamber music at the State University of Music and Performing Arts Stuttgart. Voss played the viola in the Melos Quartet for 40 years.

Biography

Education and orchestral activity 
Voss was born in 1934 in Brünen on the Lower Rhine. He received his musical education at the Robert Schumann Hochschule at Düsseldorf and at the University of Music Freiburg with Sándor Végh and Ulrich Koch. After studying violin with Sándor Végh, he changed to viola under his new teacher Ulrich Koch. Shortly thereafter, he was awarded in 1959 in Stuttgart on the viola with the 1st Prize of the German University Competition. In 1959 and 1960 Herrmann Voss attended the summer courses of the cellist Pablo Casals at Zermatt. In 1966 he again became a prizewinner of the ARD International Music Competition at Munich on the viola. From 1960 to 1967 Voss was principal violist of the Stuttgarter Kammerorchester.

Melos quartet 
In 1965 he was a founding member and until the dissolution in 2005 the only violist of the Melos Quartet.

Teaching 
From 1975, Voss was a lecturer in string quartet playing and from 1980 to 2005 professor of viola and chamber music at the State University of Music and Performing Arts Stuttgart. In addition, he regularly took on lectures at music festivals with masterclasses in Ratzeburg, Oberstdorf and at international masterclasses in London, Sydney and Tokyo as well as at the Academy for string quartet interpretation of the Fondation Hindemith at Blonay.

Painting and puppet theater 
In addition to his work as a musician, Voss also devotes himself to a creative work by making drawings, etchings, watercolor and acrylic paintings. With self-made puppet figures, masks and instruments, he regularly gives private and public performances in his own musical miniatures and pantomimes. By Voss elaborated and performed stage pieces are Festival kleiner Interpreten (Festival of small interpreters) and Bilder einer Vorstellung (Images of a performance).

Gallery of own works

Awards and honors 
 1959: First prize Deutscher Hochschulwettbewerb
 1962: Prize winner at the ARD International Music Competition at Munich
 1966: Winner Geneva International Music Competition with the Melos Quartett
 1967: Prize winner at the Villa-Lobos International Chamber Music Festival at Rio de Janeiro with the Melos Quartett
 1990: Order of Merit of the Federal Republic of Germany
 2020: Staufer medal as a personal award from the minister-president of Baden-Württemberg

References 

1934 births
Living people
German violists
20th-century German painters
20th-century German male artists
German male painters
21st-century German painters
21st-century German male artists
Academic staff of the State University of Music and Performing Arts Stuttgart
German puppeteers
Robert Schumann Hochschule alumni
People from Wesel (district)
Recipients of the Order of Merit of the Federal Republic of Germany